Interstate 476 (I-476) is a  auxiliary Interstate Highway of I-76 in the U.S. state of Pennsylvania. The highway runs from I-95 near Chester north to I-81 near Scranton, serving as the primary north–south Interstate corridor through eastern Pennsylvania. It consists of both the  Mid-County Expressway, locally referred to as the "Blue Route", through Delaware and Montgomery counties in the suburban Philadelphia area, and the tolled,  Northeast Extension of the Pennsylvania Turnpike, which connects the Delaware Valley with the Lehigh Valley, the Pocono Mountains, and the Wyoming Valley to the north.

The Mid-County Expressway passes through suburban areas, while the Northeast Extension predominantly runs through rural areas of mountains, forest, and farmland, with development closer to Philadelphia and in the Lehigh Valley and the Wyoming Valley. I-476 intersects many major roads, including I-76 (Schuylkill Expressway) in West Conshohocken, I-276 (Pennsylvania Turnpike) in Plymouth Meeting, U.S. Route 22 (US 22) near Allentown, and I-80 near Hickory Run State Park.

It significantly helped reduce congestion through King of Prussia and the Schuylkill Expressway as it provided a more direct link from the Philadelphia Main Line suburbs to the northern suburbs of Philadelphia and New Jersey. The highway was initially planned to connect down to I-95 in Delaware County, but, due to environmental and local opposition, this portion did not open until 1991.

In 1996, the I-476 designation was affixed to the preexisting Northeast Extension of the Pennsylvania Turnpike, replacing Pennsylvania Route 9 (PA 9). This was an older four-lane pre-Interstate limited-access highway that opened in sections between 1955 and 1957. Of earlier design, its cross section was very narrow, with only  between opposing lanes of traffic in places. This extended I-476 north of Plymouth Meeting to Clarks Summit (near Scranton) as a part of the Pennsylvania Turnpike system. I-476 connected to the Northeast Extension at a state-of-the-art three-level interchange. This provided direct access to both I-276 east and I-476 north, now on the Northeast Extension. With the redesignation of the Northeast Extension, I-476 surpassed I-495 in Massachusetts as the longest auxiliary Interstate Highway, a record it will hold until the completion of I-369 in Texas. I-476 was widened to six lanes from the Mid-County Interchange to south of Quakertown between 2011 and 2020.

Route description

Woodlyn to Plymouth Meeting

The portion of I-476 between I-95 and the Pennsylvania Turnpike (I-276) runs north–south through Delaware and Montgomery counties and is officially known as the Mid-County Expressway and the Veterans Memorial Highway, as well as by the nickname the "Blue Route". The road's southern terminus is at a directional T interchange with I-95 near Chester, a city southwest of Philadelphia in Delaware County, near the Philadelphia International Airport. Heading north, the road passes under CSX's Philadelphia Subdivision rail line and has an interchange with MacDade Boulevard in Woodlyn, where it narrows to a four-lane parkway that runs parallel to the Crum Creek. It winds through the western Philadelphia suburbs of Wallingford and Swarthmore, where I-476 passes under SEPTA's Media/Wawa Line and comes to a diamond interchange with Baltimore Pike just west of Springfield. From here, the freeway crosses over SEPTA's Route 101 trolley line and continues north to Springfield, where it meets US 1 at a three-level diamond interchange.

Past US 1, the parallel Crum Creek splits to the northwest and I-476 continues through wooded suburban areas. Along this stretch, the road briefly gains a third southbound lane. The freeway comes to a partial cloverleaf interchange with PA 3 in Broomall, where it widens to six lanes. The route continues to Radnor Township, which is part of the Philadelphia Main Line suburbs, reaching an interchange with US 30 west of Villanova. Stone monuments, including a large stone cairn atop a hill and a large crushed-stone image of a mythological griffin on a hillside, were constructed at the US 30 interchange to commemorate Radnor's history as part of the Welsh Tract. Proceeding northward, the road passes over SEPTA's Norristown High Speed Line before it crosses under Amtrak's Keystone Corridor rail line. The route enters Montgomery County and comes to an interchange with I-76 (Schuylkill Expressway) in West Conshohocken that also has access to PA 23. After crossing over Norfolk Southern's Harrisburg Line, the Schuylkill River, SEPTA's Manayunk/Norristown Line, and the Schuylkill River Trail on the Pearl Harbor Memorial Bridge, the freeway heads into Plymouth Township. In Plymouth Township, the route has interchanges with Ridge Pike and Chemical Road before passing over Norfolk Southern's Morrisville Line and reaching an interchange serving Germantown Pike and Plymouth Road in Plymouth Meeting. The entire length of the Blue Route is designated the Blue Route Scenic Byway, a Pennsylvania Scenic Byway.

Plymouth Meeting to Clarks Summit

In Plymouth Meeting, I-476 comes to the Mid-County Interchange, where it enters the Pennsylvania Turnpike system and has a mainline toll plaza before coming to an interchange with I-276 (which follows the mainline of the Pennsylvania Turnpike), heading north from here as the six-lane Northeast Extension of the Pennsylvania Turnpike. The route continues through the Philadelphia suburbs, passing over CSX's Stony Creek Branch rail line, and reaches an interchange with PA 63 west of Lansdale that serves the North Penn Valley region. Past this interchange, the route enters a more rural setting of woods and farms, narrowing to four lanes before crossing into Bucks County and coming to an interchange with PA 663 west of Quakertown. The Northeast Extension continues northwest into Lehigh County, part of the Lehigh Valley metropolitan area, past the PA 663 interchange. Here, the road heads into more developed areas and passes over Norfolk Southern's Reading Line. The route has ramps to the dual-access Allentown Service Plaza in Upper Macungie Township, and, just north of it, I-476 reaches an interchange with US 22 (Lehigh Valley Thruway) west of Allentown, which offers an indirect connection to I-78 and PA 309.

North of Allentown, the route crosses under Norfolk Southern's C&F Secondary rail line and runs through farmland with some development. The road passes under Blue Mountain in the Lehigh Tunnel and enters Carbon County in the Pocono Mountains region. Here, I-476 crosses over the Lehigh River and Norfolk Southern's Lehigh Line before it has an interchange with US 209 east of Lehighton. Continuing through mountainous areas, the route has ramps to the dual-access Hickory Run Service Plaza prior to coming to a diamond interchange with PA 903. Past here, I-476 cuts through Hickory Run State Park before reaching an interchange with PA 940 providing a connection to I-80 just to the north of the state park. The route continues through mountainous terrain, heading into Luzerne County at a crossing of the Lehigh River and coming to an interchange with PA 115 in Bear Creek that provides access to nearby Wilkes-Barre. The route comes to a mainline toll plaza near Pittston that marks the northern end of the distance-based toll system along the Northeast Extension. A short distance later, an interchange with PA 315 provides indirect access to I-81 and Scranton.

Past this interchange, I-476 crosses under a Luzerne and Susquehanna Railway line before it enters Lackawanna County. Here, the route has a bridge over a Luzerne and Susquehanna Railway line and heads through built-up areas of the Wyoming Valley as it skirts around Scranton, passing under I-81 before coming to a bridge over Norfolk Southern's Sunbury Line, the Lackawanna River, and a Reading Blue Mountain and Northern Railroad line. I-476 reaches a mainline all-electronic toll plaza and an exit to Keyser Avenue in Taylor. Past the bridge, I-476 comes to a hairpin curve and reaches a mainline all-electronic toll plaza before it ends at an interchange with connections to I-81, US 6, and US 11. As this is beyond the Clarks Summit toll plaza, no toll is collected on this short segment.

Tolls

The Northeast Extension of the Pennsylvania Turnpike uses all-electronic tolling, with tolls payable by toll by plate (which uses automatic license plate recognition to take a photo of the vehicle's license plate and mail a bill to the vehicle owner) or E-ZPass. Tolls along the section between the Mid-County and Wyoming Valley toll plazas, along with the mainline Pennsylvania Turnpike between Warrendale and Neshaminy Falls, are based on distance traveled. Mainline toll plazas are also located at Keyser Avenue and Clarks Summit, charging a flat rate using toll by plate or E-ZPass. There are no tolls on exit ramps between Wyoming Valley and Clarks Summit. , it costs a passenger vehicle $24.90 to travel the length of the Northeast Extension between Mid-County and Wyoming Valley using toll by plate and $12.10 using E-ZPass. The Keyser Avenue and Clarks Summit toll plazas cost $3.00 using toll by plate and $1.40 using E-ZPass for passenger vehicles.

Until March 2020, the road used the ticket system method of tolling between the Mid-County and Wyoming Valley toll plazas along with the mainline Pennsylvania Turnpike between Warrendale and Neshaminy Falls. With the ticket system, a motorist received a ticket upon entering the turnpike at an interchange and paid the fare and surrendered the ticket upon exiting. If a motorist lost the ticket, the turnpike charged the highest fare to the exit where the motorist left. Cash, credit cards, and E-ZPass were accepted at traditional toll plazas.

On April 29, 2018, the turnpike commission implemented all-electronic tolling at the Keyser Avenue and Clarks Summit toll plazas. All-electronic tolling was originally scheduled to be implemented on the entire length of the Northeast Extension in the later part of 2021. However, in March 2020, the switch was made early as a result of the COVID-19 pandemic. The all-electronic tolling system on the turnpike will initially use existing toll booths at exits, along with existing equipment at all-electronic tolling interchanges, until mainline toll gantries between interchanges are constructed. Mainline toll gantries are planned to be in operation by 2025.

Services

Emergency assistance and information
The Northeast Extension formerly had a call box every mile for its entire length. In September 2017, the turnpike commission began removing the call boxes due to increased mobile phone usage making the call boxes obsolete. Motorists may also dial *11 on their mobile phones.  First responder services are available to all turnpike customers via the GEICO Safety Patrol program. The safety patrol program, which is free, looks for disabled motorists, debris, and accidents along the roadway and provides assistance. The patrol service is available 24 hours every day of the year. Each patrol vehicle covers a  stretch of the turnpike. Towing services are available from authorized service garages located near the highway. Pennsylvania State Police Troop T patrols the Pennsylvania Turnpike Northeast Extension. It has headquarters in Highspire (along the mainline turnpike) and a substation along the Northeast Extension at Pocono.

The Pennsylvania Turnpike Commission (PTC) broadcasts current roadway, traffic, and weather conditions via highway advisory radio transmitters at each exit. The 511PA travel information service provides alerts, an interactive map, weather information, and traffic cameras to motorists. There are variable-message signs located along the roadway that provide information to motorists such as accidents, construction, weather, and traffic congestion.

Service plazas

The Northeast Extension of the Pennsylvania Turnpike has two service plazas at Allentown and Hickory Run, which are accessible by both northbound and southbound traffic. The service plazas offer multiple fast-food restaurants, a Sunoco gas station, and a 7-Eleven convenience store. Other amenities are available such as an ATM, E-ZPass sales, free cellphone charging, Pennsylvania Lottery sales, picnic areas, restrooms, tourist information, Travel Board information centers, and Wi-Fi. The Allentown plaza contains a seasonal farmers' market. Both plazas offer conventional gasoline and diesel fuel. The Sunoco and 7-Eleven locations are operated by 7-Eleven itself while the restaurants and general upkeep of the service plazas are operated by Applegreen.

In 2006, HMSHost was awarded a contract to reconstruct the service plazas along the turnpike. The reconstruction of the service plazas, which was to cost more than $150 million (equivalent to $ in ), included a food court layout and modernized restrooms. The Allentown service plaza was rebuilt between September 2007 and May 2008 while the Hickory Run service plaza was rebuilt between January 2009 and November 2010. 

The Art Sparks program was launched in 2017 as a partnership between the turnpike commission and the Pennsylvania Council on the Arts to install public art created by local students in the Arts in Education residency program in service plazas along the turnpike over the next five years. The public art consists of a mural reflecting the area where the service plaza is located.

History

Mid-County Expressway
 

Originally planned as far back as 1929, the Mid-County Expressway was later proposed by the Pennsylvania Turnpike Commission as the "Chester Extension" of the Pennsylvania Turnpike in 1954. After the advent of the Interstate Highway System, the project was transferred to the Pennsylvania Department of Highways to be built as part of the system, designating it first as Interstate 495 (I-495) and later as Interstate 480 (I-480), as I-76 was designated as I-80S at the time. The present-day I-476 designation was assigned on February 6, 1964, when I-80S was renumbered as I-76.

The road received its nickname from a 1958 location report indicating various proposed geographic configurations of an expressway through Delaware County with lines of various colors on a map. The "blue route" through the Crum Creek valley won out over other contenders, which included a more easterly "red route" and "yellow route" and a more westerly "green route".

As one of the most controversial Interstate Highways in Pennsylvania, construction of I-476 began in 1967 but would take decades to build due to litigation between the Pennsylvania Department of Transportation (PennDOT) and several communities in the road's path over environmental concerns. Two sections of the road in Radnor Township and in Lower Merion Township were built in 1970 but remained closed to traffic as they did not connect to any other roads. The section of I-476 between I-76 and Chemical Road opened to traffic in 1979 while the section between I-95 and MacDade Boulevard opened to traffic in August 1988. The road opened between Chemical Road and Plymouth Road in August 1991 while the final section of I-476 between MacDade Boulevard and I-76 was opened in December 1991.

An agreement in 1985 led to many environmental compromises in the road's design, including a downsized four-lane design south of PA 3 (although a part of the span between exits 9 and 5 has a third lane on the southbound side), ramp meters, and scenic route status, prohibiting the erection of advertisement billboards along the entire freeway portion. The Radnor Gateway Enhancement Strategy was implemented to install largescale sculpture elements by artist William P. Reimann, most notably the stone griffin and cairn at exit 13. While the redesigned highway was largely well-received, the constriction to four lanes has led to bottleneck conditions in the area, and many communities that originally opposed the road have now called for its widening. The Philadelphia Inquirer dubbed I-476 "the most costly, most bitterly opposed highway in Pennsylvania history" due to the decades of opposition it garnered.

Plans to build an interchange connecting I-476 (Mid-County Expressway) to the Pennsylvania Turnpike were made; the turnpike commission approved a contract to build the interchange in March 1989. That June, a losing bidder decided to challenge the turnpike commission, saying it violated female and minority contracting rules regarding the percentage of these employees that were used for the project. Under this rule, bidders were supposed to have at least 12 percent of contracts to minority-owned companies and at least four percent to female-owned companies. The losing bidder had 12.4 percent of the contracts to minority companies and 4.2 percent to female-owned companies while the winning bidder had 6.1 percent and 3.7 percent respectively. The turnpike commission decided to rebid the contract but was sued by the original contractor. This dispute delayed the construction of the interchange. The contract was rebid in November 1989 after the Supreme Court of Pennsylvania permitted it. The interchange between I-476 and the turnpike mainline was completed in November 1992; the ramps to the Northeast Extension opened a month later. An official ribbon-cutting took place on December 15, 1992.

In the 2000s, the road underwent a rehabilitation project, including paving, bridge repair, and ramp maintenance of the entire length of the freeway between I-95 and the Pennsylvania Turnpike. The section between I-95 and PA 3 was repaved in 2005 while the section between PA 3 and I-76 was repaved in 2007. The section between I-76 and I-276, which was completely reconstructed, was finished in the end of 2011.

Northeast Extension

In 1953, an extension of the Pennsylvania Turnpike from the mainline near Plymouth Meeting north through Northeastern Pennsylvania to the New York state line near Binghamton, New York, was proposed. Groundbreaking for the Northeastern Extension occurred on March 25, 1954, in White Haven, with Governor John S. Fine and commission chair Thomas J. Evans present. The Northeast Extension was planned to run from the mainline Pennsylvania Turnpike in Plymouth Meeting north to a temporary terminus at Scranton. In April 1954, $233 million (equivalent to $ in ) in bonds were issued to build the Northeastern Extension along with the Delaware River–Turnpike Toll Bridge on the mainline Pennsylvania Turnpike. The Northeast Extension was built with a  median in order to save money. Due to the mountainous terrain it passed through, a large amount of earthwork was necessary to build the road along with the construction of large bridges. The Northeast Extension also included the two-lane Lehigh Tunnel under Blue Mountain. The tunnel was originally going to be named for commission chair Evans but was changed when he was convicted of conspiracy to defraud the commission of $19 million (equivalent to $ in ).

The roadway opened between Plymouth Meeting and the Lehigh Valley interchange near Allentown on November 23, 1955. The highway was extended north to a temporary interchange at Emerald on December 28 of that year. The Northeast Extension was opened between Emerald and Wyoming Valley on April 1, 1957. The entire length of the Northeast Extension was finished on November 7, 1957, with the completion of the northernmost part between Wyoming Valley and Scranton. The part of the Northeast Extension between Scranton and the New York state line was not built as part of the Pennsylvania Turnpike system but rather the Interstate Highway System as I-81. At the northern terminus, the Northeast Extension narrowed to two lanes along the northbound offramp at Scranton to come to its northern terminus, with an abandoned short spur of the mainline heading north. A pair of trumpet interchanges were built to connect the Northeast Extension and I-81. In 1974, the roadway was designated PA 9.

When it first opened, traffic on the Northeast Extension of the Pennsylvania Turnpike was light. By the 1970s, traffic along the roadway increased with the completion of the connecting I-80 and the rising popularity of the Pocono Mountains as a vacation destination. As a result, the two-lane Lehigh Tunnel faced serious congestion. Plans were made to either bypass the tunnel or add a second tube. The turnpike commission decided it would build a second tunnel as the cost was lower than building a bypass. In 1988, a $37-million (equivalent to $ in ) contract was awarded to build the second tube. Groundbreaking for the tunnel took place on February 14, 1989, with Governor Robert P. Casey in attendance. Excavation of the new tunnel began in July of that year. Construction of the second tube utilized the New Austrian tunneling method, which reduced the cost of the tunnel by $5 million to $6 million (equivalent to $ to $ in ). It was the first tunnel in the US to use this construction method. The second tube at Lehigh Tunnel opened on November 22, 1991, with Governor Casey in attendance leading a line of antique cars. Construction of the tunnel cost $45 million (equivalent to $ in ). The new tube is used for southbound traffic while the original tube carries northbound traffic. The newer tunnel is wider, higher, and brighter than the original.

On February 1, 1995, the Keyser Avenue interchange near Scranton was slated to open at a cost of $22.4 million (equivalent to $ in ). Construction of this interchange also involved constructing a new mainline flat-rate toll barrier near the new interchange.

On November 1, 1996, the Northeast Extension was added to the Interstate Highway System as a northern extension of I-476, replacing the PA 9 designation along the road. The addition of the second tube at the Lehigh Tunnel along with new guardrails and line striping was necessary for the toll road to become an Interstate. It was hoped that the Interstate designation would bring economic development and tourism to the areas served by the roadway. This extension resulted in I-476 surpassing the  I-495 in Massachusetts as the longest auxiliary Interstate Highway, though it could be contested for this title in the future by I-369 in Texas.

The tickets along the Northeast Extension of the Pennsylvania Turnpike were originally handed out by person. In 1987, machines started to replace humans in distributing tickets. In 1990, an electronic toll collection system was proposed for the Pennsylvania Turnpike, where a motorist would create an account and use an electronic device that would be read from an electronic tollbooth. The motorist would be billed later. The multi-state electronic tolling system, which was to be called E-ZPass, was planned to be implemented by 1998. The planned installation date was later pushed back to 2000. On December 2, 2000, E-ZPass debuted along the Northeast Extension of the Pennsylvania Turnpike between Mid-County and Lehigh Valley. On December 15, 2001, E-ZPass was extended to include the entire length of the Northeast Extension of the Pennsylvania Turnpike. Commercial vehicles were allowed to start using E-ZPass on December 14, 2002.

On November 24, 2004, the day before Thanksgiving, 2,000 Teamsters Union employees went on strike, after contract negotiations failed. This was the first strike in the history of the roadway. As this is usually one of the busiest traffic days in the US, to avoid traffic jams, tolls were waived for the rest of the day. Starting on November 25, turnpike management personnel collected flat-rate passenger tolls of $2 and commercial tolls of $15 from cash customers on the ticketed system, while E-ZPass customers were charged the lesser of the actual toll or the same flat rates. The strike ended after seven days when both sides reached an agreement on November 30, 2004. Normal toll collection resumed December 1, 2004.

In 2007, the turnpike commission announced plans to widen the Northeast Extension to six lanes between Mid-County and Lansdale. The project divided this stretch of highway into two sections. Work on the southern section began in January 2008 with the replacement of two bridges over the Northeast Extension to accommodate the widened highway. Construction on the actual widening phase commenced in January 2011. Completion was originally planned in 2013; however, construction fell a year behind schedule. Construction on widening the northern section started in May 2014, while work on widening the southern section finished up in October of that year. This new northbound exit ramp opened December 4, 2016, and the companion southbound onramp opened a week later. Construction along the northern section was originally planned to finish by the end of 2016 but was delayed until mid-2017. Construction was substantially completed, with all six lanes open, by August 31, 2017.

Once widening was completed from Mid-County to Lansdale, a similar project began on the next segment of highway, from Lansdale to Quakertown. As done on the first project, the Lansdale–Quakertown segment was rebuilt in two sections, with a southern half started in late 2017, widening the road to six lanes with full shoulders. Advance work began in early 2013 with replacement of several bridges in this area north of Lansdale, with work on the actual widening beginning in late 2017. Widening of this section was completed in late 2020.

The turnpike commission has stated its intention of continuing the widening effort past Quakertown all the way north to the Lehigh Valley interchange at milepost 56, although it will take until the late 2020s to get it done.

In 1990, plans were made to build an interchange at PA 903 in Carbon County. A bill authorizing construction of this interchange was signed into law by Governor Casey in July of that year. Plans for this interchange were cancelled by the turnpike commission in 1995. In 2006, plans for an interchange at PA 903 were resurrected, with the proposed interchange to be all-electronic, in that it will only accept E-ZPass. Construction on the $23-million (equivalent to $ in ) interchange began in the middle of 2008. The interchange opened to traffic on June 30, 2015.

On April 28, 2016, plans were announced for a "Scranton Beltway" to use I-476 as a bypass for I-81 around the heavily congested segment through Scranton and its suburbs. The turnpike between the two I-81 interchanges carries an average of 10,000 vehicles per day vs. 70,000 on the parallel segment of I-81. This project will build two high-speed connections between I-476 and I-81: one south of Scranton in Dupont and one north of Scranton in South Abington Township. Tolls on the connections will be paid with E-ZPass or toll by plate. Construction of this project is expected to cost $160 million. In 2021, design work on the project resumed, with construction expected to begin in 2025.

Howard M. Sexton, a 70-year-old truck driver from New Jersey, was killed in the southbound Lehigh Tunnel on February 21, 2018, when an electrical conduit broke free from the tunnel's ceiling and fell through the windshield of his truck, striking him in the head. In a preliminary report issued on May 1, 2018, the National Transportation Safety Board revealed that a  section of conduit fell into the path of Sexton's truck after the steel support system for the conduits, which were suspended from the apex of the tunnel arch directly over the travel lanes, failed. The tunnel had last been inspected in 2016, at which time an inspector found evidence of corrosion on several of the steel support straps.

Exit list
The old exit numbers (31 and upward) on the Northeast Extension were a continuation of old exit numbers 1 through 30 on the east–west turnpike. On the east–west turnpike, the interchange with I-476 was old exit 25A because it was between old exits 25 and 26 on the east–west turnpike.

See also

References

External links

 I-476 on Kurumi.com
 Interstate Guide - I-476
 Pennsylvania Highways: I-476
 I-476 at AARoads.com
 Pennsylvania Roads - I-476
 The Roads of Metro Philadelphia: Mid-County Expressway ("Blue Route") (I-476)
 The Roads of Metro Philadelphia: Pennsylvania Turnpike - Northeast Extension (I-476)
 Official Pennsylvania Turnpike website

76-4
76-4
Toll roads in Pennsylvania
Tolled sections of Interstate Highways
4
Transportation in Delaware County, Pennsylvania
Transportation in Montgomery County, Pennsylvania
Transportation in Bucks County, Pennsylvania
Transportation in Lehigh County, Pennsylvania
Transportation in Carbon County, Pennsylvania
Transportation in Luzerne County, Pennsylvania
Transportation in Lackawanna County, Pennsylvania